Louis Maratier (3 March 1922 – 21 April 1998) was a French post-impressionist artist and painter who specialised in austere still life and static depictions of animals. His best known work is, however, a Landscape; Les Atlanteans (Musée d'Art Moderne de Saint-Etienne). Although Maratier was born in Pontivy, Brittany, his parents moved to Ireland before World War II, Maratier only returning to France in 1951 to study art in Paris. In 1962 Maratier rejected the Abstract Expressionism which he had initially advocated and developed a more traditionally figurative, albeit minimalist, style specialising in the Monochrome still lifes for which he is now best known.

Work in collections
Fondation Cartier pour l'art contemporain, Paris
Musée d'Art Moderne de Saint-Etienne
Irish Museum of Modern Art, Dublin
Museu d'Art Contemporani de Barcelona, Barcelona

1922 births
1998 deaths
20th-century French painters
20th-century French male artists
French male painters